The HP Pavilion dv2 was a series of 12" notebooks manufactured by Hewlett-Packard Company.

DV2z
In January 2009, AMD announced the Yukon mobile platform for ultra-portable notebooks. The announcement was shortly followed by HP introducing the dv2z based on the Yukon platform. The dv2z was an ultra-portable notebook that measured under 1-inch thick and weighed under 3.81 pounds. The traditional internal optical drive (DVD-ROM) was moved to an external USB enclosure to allow for the slimmer design.

The laptop initially came with an AMD Athlon Neo MV-40 processor and used ATI Radeon Xpress X1250 integrated graphics. The ATI Mobility Radeon HD 3410 was an optional discrete GPU. On June 9, 2009, HP incorporated the dual core AMD Athlon/Turion Neo X2 processors. 

The laptop came with Microsoft Windows Vista pre-installed.  A free upgrade offer for Microsoft Windows 7 was made available later in 2009.

Configuration
 Processors AMD Athlon Neo MV-40 1.6 GHz (single core) or AMD Athlon/Turion Neo X2 1.6 GHz (dual core)
 Memory 1x DDR2 SO-DIMM, maximum 4 GB, single-channel, 400 MHz (PC2-6400)
 Chipset AMD RS690M + SB600
 Graphics ATI Radeon Xpress X1250 IGP or discrete ATI Radeon HD 3410 512 MB (DDR2)
 Display  12.1-inch 1280x800 WXGA TN with glossy finish
 Sound IDT high-definition audio
 Storage SATA-II hard disk with impact sensor
 Network Broadcom BCM4322 802.11a/b/g/n with bluetooth, wired RJ-45 Realtek Fast Ethernet 
 Camera 2.1 MP Chicony Electronics
 Battery 4910 mAh 3-cell Lithium Ion
 Optical Drive  optional USB-2 External CDRW/Blu-ray
 Mobile broadband optional mobile broadband chipset with Gobi
 Operating System Microsoft Windows Vista or Windows 7 32/64-bit
 Build aluminium-magnesium alloy chassis in either "espresso black" or "moonlight white" finish
 External Ports 1x Fast Ethernet, 1x VGA, 1x microphone jack, 1x headphone jack, 3x USB-2.0 ports, 1x HDMI, 5-in-1 flash reader, 1x power adapter port

References

Pavilion dv2
Computer-related introductions in 2009